Champion is a community in central Douglas County, Missouri, United States. Champion is located on Missouri Route WW on the west bank of Fox Creek.

References

Unincorporated communities in Douglas County, Missouri
Unincorporated communities in Missouri